Pamosu is a Papuan language of Madang Province, Papua New Guinea. Some of the older generations speak Pal, a related language. It has been documented by Andrew Pick.

Pamosu grammar has been documented in Tupper (2012).

References

Sources
 

Tiboran languages
Languages of Madang Province